Wilbert Robinson Jr. (born December 25, 1949) is a former American Basketball Association (ABA) player. In his senior year at West Virginia University, Robinson was selected to the AP All-American Third Team. Robinson was taken with the seventh pick in the fourth round of the 1972 NBA Draft, however he never played in the NBA. Robinson played one season in the ABA for the Memphis Tams, averaging 8.6 points, 2.9 assists, and 1.8 rebounds per game.

References

1949 births
Living people
All-American college men's basketball players
American men's basketball players
Basketball players from Pennsylvania
Houston Rockets draft picks
Memphis Tams players
Shooting guards
West Virginia Mountaineers men's basketball players